Bolling Haxall House, also known as the Woman's Club, is a historic residential building located in Richmond, Virginia. It was built by Bolling Walker Haxall in 1858 and is a three-story  Italian Villa style dwelling of sandstone-colored stucco, scored to imitate ashlar.  It features a projecting central entrance on the front facade, a raised portico (with arched openings) supported by four fluted columns, and an elaborate double-bracketed, dentiled cornice.  An auditorium was added in 1916, after the home's acquisition by the Woman's Club in 1900.

It was listed on the National Register of Historic Places in 1972.

See also
National Register of Historic Places listings in Richmond, Virginia

References

External links 
Bolling W. Haxall House, 211 East Franklin Street, Richmond, Independent City, VA: 1 photo at Historic American Buildings Survey

Historic American Buildings Survey in Virginia
Houses on the National Register of Historic Places in Virginia
Italianate architecture in Virginia
Houses completed in 1858
Houses in Richmond, Virginia
National Register of Historic Places in Richmond, Virginia